Maxwell Anderson may refer to:

 Maxwell Anderson (1888–1959), American playwright and journalist
 Maxwell L. Anderson (born 1956), American museum director
 Maxwell Hendry Maxwell-Anderson (1879–1951), British barrister and colonial judge